Devid Striesow (born 1 October 1973 in Bergen auf Rügen, East Germany) is a German actor. 

After his school education, he moved to Berlin to start an apprenticeship as a goldsmith but the goldsmith's business went bankrupt before Striesow could start. The fall of the Berlin Wall in 1989 changed his life plans, so he went back to school to take his Abitur. Initially, he studied jazz guitar. He then applied to the Ernst Busch Academy of Dramatic Arts, Berlin. His graduating class of 1999 included Nina Hoss and Fritzi Haberlandt.

He performs in theatre, film (since 2000) and television (since 1999). He starred as "Sturmbannführer Herzog" (Bernhard Krüger) in Stefan Ruzowitzky's 2007 film The Counterfeiters, which was awarded the Academy Award for Best Foreign Language Film for that year.
Striesow is also a speaker for audiobooks.

Striesow has been married to his manager Ines Ganzberger since 2018. They are parents to a son (born 2016) and live in Berlin. His son Ludwig Simon (born 1996) from a previous relationship is also an actor. There are three other children from a previous marriage.

Selected filmography

References

External links
 

1973 births
German male television actors
German male film actors
21st-century German male actors
Living people
Ernst Busch Academy of Dramatic Arts alumni
People from Bergen auf Rügen